Heat exhaustion is a severe form of heat illness. It is a medical emergency. Heat exhaustion is caused by the loss of water and electrolytes through sweating. 

The United States Department of Labor makes the following recommendation, "Heat illness can be prevented. Remember these three things: water, rest, and shade."

Causes
Common causes of heat exhaustion include:
 Hot, sunny, humid weather
 Physical exertion, especially in hot, humid weather
 Due to impaired thermoregulation, elderly people and infants can get serious heat illness even at rest, if the weather outside is hot and humid, and they are not getting enough cool air.
 Some drugs, such as diuretics, antihistamines, beta-blockers, alcohol,  MDMA ('Ecstasy', 'Molly'), and other amphetamines can cause an increase in the risk of heat exhaustion.

Especially during physical exertion, risk factors for heat exhaustion include:
 Wearing dark, padded, or insulated clothing; hats; and/or helmets (for example, football pads, turnout gear, etc.)
 Having a higher percentage of body fat
 Dehydration
 Fever
 Some medications, like beta blockers and antipsychotic medicines

Signs and symptoms
Symptoms of heat exhaustion include skin tingling, nausea, dizziness, irritability, headache, thirst, weakness, vomiting, high body temperature, excessive sweating, pupil dilation, and decreased urine output.

Treatment

First aid
First aid for heat exhaustion includes:
 Moving the person to a cool place
 Having the patient take off extra layers of clothes
 Cooling the patient down by fanning them and/or putting wet towels on their body
 Having them lie down and put their feet up if they are feeling dizzy
 Having them drink water or sports drinks unless they are unconscious, too disoriented to drink, or vomiting
 Turning the patient on their side if they are vomiting

Emergency medical treatment
If an individual with heat exhaustion receives medical treatment, Emergency Medical Technicians (EMTs), doctors, and/or nurses may also:
 Provide supplemental oxygen
 Administer intravenous fluids and electrolytes if they are too confused to drink and/or are vomiting

Prognosis
If left untreated, heat exhaustion may progress to heat stroke.

See also
 Occupational heat stress
 Heat stroke

References

Effects of external causes
Wilderness medical emergencies